Dariusz Bladek (born April 1, 1994) is a professional Canadian football offensive lineman for the Toronto Argonauts of the Canadian Football League (CFL). He played college football for the Bethune-Cookman Wildcats from 2012 to 2015.

Early life
Bladek was born in Clifton, New Jersey, to his Canadian mother, Joyce, and Polish father, Bogdan. He grew up in New Jersey and his family moved to Kissimmee, Florida, where he attended Poinciana High School.

Professional career
After completing his third year of college eligibility in 2015, Bladek declared for the 2016 NFL Draft. After going unselected, he attended mini-camp with the Baltimore Ravens, but was not signed to a contract. Through a conversation with the Calgary Stampeders, he learned that he could qualify as a National player because his mother was a Canadian citizen. Due to the length of time that was required to apply for a Canadian passport, he had to bypass the 2016 CFL Draft and was eligible for the 2017 CFL Draft.

Saskatchewan Roughriders
Bladek was drafted by the Saskatchewan Roughriders in the second round, 11th overall, in the 2017 CFL Draft and signed with the club on May 26, 2017. He made the team out of training camp and dressed in all 18 regular season games and two post-season games in his rookie year. His first professional game was on June 22, 2017, against the Montreal Alouettes. In the 2018 season, he earned his first career start, also against the Alouettes, on June 30, 2018. He played in 16 regular season games in 2018 and 11 games in 2019.

Toronto Argonauts
Upon becoming a free agent, Bladek signed a contract with the Toronto Argonauts on February 11, 2020. He signed a contract extension with the Argonauts on December 28, 2020.

References

External links
Toronto Argonauts bio

1994 births
Living people
Canadian football offensive linemen
Players of American football from New Jersey
Saskatchewan Roughriders players
Toronto Argonauts players
Bethune–Cookman Wildcats football players
Sportspeople from Clifton, New Jersey
American people of Polish descent
American people of Canadian descent